Amir Ashour (Arabic: أمير عاشور; born ) is an Iraqi LGBT rights activist who founded IraQueer, a non-governmental organisation that advocates for the rights of LGBT people in Iraq, in 2015.

Personal life 
Ashour was born in Baghdad, Iraq, and raised in Sulaymaniyah in the Kurdistan Region. Ashour was raised practicing Islam, though stopped following the religion in 2008, stating "Islam didn't work for me".

In 2014, after being arrested twice due to his work in the human rights sector, Ashour requested asylum in Sweden while there on a business trip; in 2015, he was granted political asylum. As of 2016, Ashour lives in Malmö.

Ashour graduated from Columbia University in New York City with a master's degree in human rights in 2018. As of 2021, Ashour is a student at Harvard Law School.

LGBT advocacy 
Prior to leaving Iraq, Ashour spent for years working for human rights organisations advocating for the rights of LGBT people, women, and sex workers.

Ashour founded IraQueer in March 2015 while living in exile in Sweden, which was Iraq's first national LGBT organisation. Formed on a voluntary basis, it initially focused on publishing accounts from LGBT Iraqis, in addition to producing educational resources for Iraq's LGBT community, including guides on the law, sexual health, and security, in English, Arabic, and Kurdish. IraQueer subsequently went on to perform international advocacy in support of the rights of LGBT people living in Iraq, including with the United Nations, in addition to providing safe housing and medical help. Ashour left his position as executive director of IraQueer in July 2021.

Ashour has been critical of the media's presentation of homophobic attacks in Iraq as being linked to the Islamic State, stating that anti-LGBT activity and rhetoric in the country had been prevalent for decades prior, and "deeply rooted" in Arab culture, as well as within powerful militias who supported the national government. He has called for the creation of neutral and respectful terms for LGBT people in Arabic and Kurdish, citing contemporary linguistic terms in the languages often being offensive in nature.

Ashour has also called for the narrative around LGBT people in the Middle East to be changed, including acknowledging that not all LGBT people in Iraq struggle with or reject their sexuality.

Ashour has also expressed doubts at Kurdish governments in Iraq and Syria's attempts to present themselves as being LGBT friendly, stating that "talking is easier than action" and felt such statements were made to appease the West. He criticised security forces in Sulaymaniyah in 2021 launching an operation to arrest "suspected" LGBT people, despite the Kurdistan Region's deputy prime minister Qubad Talabani stating "all citizens, regardless of... gender (and or gender preference) ... and sexual preference" deserved equal rights in 2019.

In 2022, Ashour criticised the Iraqi government's proposed legislation that would prohibit homosexuality in the country, stating it would legalise the murders of LGBT people. Ashour criticised the influence of Iraqi politicians such as Muqtada al-Sadr, who had suggested monkeypox was a result of homosexual behaviour, over the government, and accused them of launching public campaigns against homosexuality to avoid discussing real issues facing Iraq, such as unemployment and corruption.

Recognition 
The Special Broadcasting Service in Australia called Ashour "Iraq's only gay activist", though he has been critical of this label. He has been interviewed by HuffPost, The Independent, and The Washington Post.

In 2021, Ashour was inducted as a Generation Change Honoree at the MTV Europe Music Awards in Budapest.

Ashour has been nominated for the Raoul Wallenberg Academy Prize and the David Kato Voice and Vision Award.

In 2022, Ashour was awarded the Gay Times Honour for International Community Trailblazer.

See also 
 IraQueer
 Rasan
 Zhiar Ali

References 

Living people
Iraqi human rights activists
Iraqi LGBT rights activists
Year of birth missing (living people)
Kurdish LGBT people